Nancy Jones may refer to:

 Nancy Jones (missionary) (1860–1939), African-American missionary in Africa
 Nancy "Mama" Jones, mother of rapper Jim Jones and cast member on Love & Hip Hop: New York and Chrissy & Mr. Jones
 Nancy Jones (medical examiner), Cook County Medical Examiner, Illinois, US, 2007–2012
 Nancy Jones, former television producer on Wheel of Fortune
 Nancy Lane (née Jones) (born 1971), Australian chess player

See also
 Nancy Jones House, a historic home near Cary, Wake County, North Carolina, US
 Nancy Wynne-Jones (1922–2006), Welsh and Irish artist